The variegated catshark (Asymbolus submaculatus) is a cat shark of the family Scyliorhinidae, found off New South Wales and Western Australia at depths between 30 and 200 m. Its length is up to 41 cm. The reproduction of this catshark is oviparous.

References

 

variegated catshark
Marine fish of Western Australia
variegated catshark